The southern adder (Bitis armata) is a species of venomous snake in the  family Viperidae. It is endemic to South Africa.

References

Bitis
Endemic reptiles of South Africa
Reptiles described in 1826